Hanns-Henning Fartrich (born 23 August 1963) is a former field hockey player from West Germany, who won the silver medal with the West German team at the 1988 Summer Olympics in Seoul.

References

External links
 

1963 births
Living people
German male field hockey players
Olympic field hockey players of West Germany
Field hockey players at the 1988 Summer Olympics
Olympic medalists in field hockey
Medalists at the 1988 Summer Olympics
Olympic silver medalists for West Germany